Thomas Mokopu Mofolo (22 December 1876 – 8 September 1948) is considered the greatest Basotho author. He wrote mostly in the Sesotho language, but his most popular book, Chaka, has been translated into English and other languages.

Biography
Thomas Mofolo was born in Khojane, Lesotho, on 22 December 1876. He was educated in the local schools of the Paris Evangelical Missionary Society and obtained a teacher's certificate in 1898. While he was working at the book depot in Morija, some of the missionaries encouraged him to write what was to become the first novel in Southern Sotho, Moeti oa bochabela (1907; The Traveler of the East). The edifying story of a young Sotho chieftain's conversion to Christianity, it is cleverly interwoven with traditional myths and praise poems. Its success prompted other young teachers to try their hand at fiction writing, thus launching one of the earliest literary movements in sub-Saharan Africa.

Mofolo's next book, Pitseng (1910), is built on a rather clumsy love plot in imitation of European fiction. It contains perceptive descriptions of native mores in Lesotho and in South Africa and a thoughtful, by no means encomiastic, appraisal of the influence of Christianity on traditional marriage customs.

Mofolo then composed Chaka (1925), a fictionalized account of the Zulu conqueror who built a mighty empire during the first quarter of the 19th century. Under Mofolo's pen, the eventful career of Chaka (Shaka) becomes the epic tragedy of a heroic figure whose overweening ambition drives him to insane cruelty and ultimate ruin. The earliest major contribution of black Africa to the corpus of modern world literature, Chaka is a genuine masterpiece; the narrative follows the austere curve of growth and decline which controls the structure of classic tragedy at its best; psychological motivation is sharply clarified at all points; and the author has cleverly manipulated the supernatural element, which is endowed with true symbolic value.

Although the missionaries were sensitive to the high literary quality of Chaka, the pictures of pre-Christian life that the book contains made them reluctant to publish it. In his disappointment, Mofolo left for South Africa in 1910 and gave up writing. For several years he was a labour agent, recruiting workers for the gold mines of Transvaal and the plantations of Natal. After 1927 he bought a store in Lesotho; in 1937 he acquired a farm in South Africa but was evicted under the Bantu Land Act. In 1940, a broken and sick man, he returned to Lesotho, where he died on 8 September 1948.

Recognition and legacy
The library at the National University of Lesotho is named the Thomas Mofolo Library in his honour.

In 1976, the inaugural Mofolo-Plomer Prize, created by Nadine Gordimer and so named in honour of Mofolo and South African writer William Plomer, was awarded to Mbulelo Mzamane. The judges for that year were Chinua Achebe, Alan Paton and Adam Small. Achmat Dangor, JM Coetzee (1977), Njabulo Simakahle Ndebele, Rose Zwi (1982) and Peter Wilhelm have been other recipients of the prize. 

The Thomas Mofolo Prize for Outstanding Sesotho Fiction was launched in South Africa on 6 February 2019, to be awarded in December.

Bibliography 

From the collection of the Library of Congress, Washington, DC:

Chaka (1939)
Chaka, a historical romance, with an introduction by Sir Henry Newbolt ... translated from the original Sesuto by F. H. Dutton (1931)
Chaka, 2nd enlarged edition (2000). 
Chaka, new English translation by Daniel P. Kunene (1981) 
Chaka, une épopée bantoue, French translation (1940)
Chaka Zulu: Roman, German translation and notes by Peter Sulzer (1988). 
Tjhaka, Afrikaans translation by Chris Swanepoel (1974). 
Moeti oa Bochabela (1942)
Pitseng (1942, 1968)

References

1876 births
1948 deaths
Lesotho novelists
20th-century novelists
Male novelists
Lesotho male writers
20th-century male writers
Sotho-language writers